Sheodanmal Mokha (5 August 1923 – 24 January 2007) was an Indian architect. He is known for designing B. R. Ambedkar's memorial at Deekshabhoomi in Nagpur. 

Sheodanmal Mokha was born in Phalodi, a city and a municipality in Jodhpur district, Rajasthan on 5 August 1923. He studied architecture at All India Council for Technical Education, and completed his diploma. He became an Associate Member of the Institution of Engineer (AMIE) in 1954.

After serving in many post, he went to the Indian city of Nagpur in 1956. In Nagpur the first building he designed was the Panchasheel cinema theatre, later it became a landmark. He also designed the Guru Nanak Bhawan auditorium of the University of Nagpur, the buildings of the local branches of Indian Medical Association and the Institution of Engineers, the Town Hall of Nagpur Municipal Corporation, Yeshwant Stadium, and the sprawling market yard of Nagpur Agriculture Produce Marketing Committee (APMC). He designed many complexes in Indian cities such as Indore, Hyderabad, Chennai, Bangalore, Kolkata, etc.

He died on 24 January 2007 in Nagpur.

Notes

1923 births
2007 deaths

People from Jodhpur district
20th-century Indian architects
Artists from Rajasthan